Any Man in America is the sixth studio album and ninth album overall by alternative rock band Blue October.  The album was recorded at Matchbox Studios in Austin, Texas between Summer of 2010 and March 2011, and was released August 16, 2011 by Justin Furstenfeld's Up/Down Records and distributed through RED Distribution.  The album was produced by Tim Palmer, who has previously worked with artists such as David Bowie, Robert Plant, The Cure, U2 and Pearl Jam and had mixed Blue October's album History for Sale.  The artwork on the album cover is a drawing of Justin Furstenfeld drawn by Tim Palmer's daughter Bluebell, who was three years old at the time.

The songs on the album are largely about Justin Furstenfeld's divorce and custody battle over his daughter.

The first single from the album, "The Chills", became available for digital download May 31, and impacted radio June 27, 2011. On June 9, 2011 the band posted a video of the song "The Feel Again (Stay)", directed by Merritt Fields, on YouTube.  Due to the overwhelming positive response to the video by fans, the band released the song on iTunes five days later. On Monday, July 25, 2011, the official music video for the first single, "The Chills", was released via the band's YouTube Vevo channel.

Upon release, the album topped the Amazon.com album downloads chart.  The album sold 27,275 copies in its first week, making it the highest-selling debut, the highest-selling alternative rock album, the second highest-selling independent album, and the eighth best selling album overall.  Additionally, the album was popular on iTunes where it was the best selling alternative album, and the fifth best selling album overall.  The album debuted at number eight on the Billboard 200, making it the highest-charting album of Blue October's career, although their two previous studio albums actually sold more units in their first week of release. It peaked at number two on the Billboard Independent Albums chart and number one on the Top Rock Albums Chart.

Track listing

Reviews
The album was released to mixed reviews, Allmusic rating the album with 2 out of 5 stars and stating "Justin Furstenfeld has no qualms about putting his domestic problems on display, and while heartache and ruin are well-worn rock & roll topics, self-indulgence works best when tempered with hooks, something Furstenfeld seems to have left at the crime scene." Diminuendo had to say about the album, "As long as they continue doing what they're good at - writing deeply personal, heart-wrenching lyrics - it doesn't matter where they venture musically. Any Man in America is a model to follow for great artists: an ever-changing sound with a signature lyrics and vocals," giving the album a volume setting of 9 out of 11.

Personnel
 Justin Furstenfeld – vocals, guitar, production
 Steve Schiltz - guitars
 C.B. Hudson - guitar
 Patricia Lynn Drew - backing vocals / guest vocalist
 Ray Cordero - guest vocalist
 Brendan Bond - trumpet
 Dwight Baker - engineering
 Matt Noveskey – bass, guitar
 Jeremy Furstenfeld – drums, percussion
 Ryan Delahoussaye - violin, keyboard, mandolin
 Tim Palmer - guitars, production, engineering, mixing

References

2011 albums
Blue October albums
Albums produced by Tim Palmer